Maurice Berkeley or Maurice de Berkeley may refer to:

Maurice de Berkeley "the Resolute" (1218–1281), 8th (feudal) Baron de Berkeley, English soldier and rebel
Maurice de Berkeley, 2nd Baron Berkeley (1271–1326)
Maurice de Berkeley, 4th Baron Berkeley (ca.1330–1368)
Maurice Berkeley (MP died 1400), MP for Gloucestershire
Maurice Berkeley, 3rd Baron Berkeley (1435–1506)
Maurice Berkeley (died 1581), MP
Maurice Berkeley (Gloucestershire MP) (died 1654) also MP for Gt Bedwyn 
Maurice Berkeley (Somerset MP) (c. 1577–c. 1617) also MP for Truro and Minehead  
Maurice Berkeley, 3rd Viscount Fitzhardinge (1628–1690), MP for Wells 1661–1679 and Bath 1681–1690
Maurice Berkeley (died 1717), MP for Wells 1705–8 and 1710–6
Maurice Berkeley, 1st Baron FitzHardinge (1788–1867)
Maurice Berkeley Portman (1833–1888), political figure in Canada West